Cummings Research Park, located primarily in the city of Huntsville, Alabama is the second largest research park in the United States and the fourth largest in the world. It is one of the world’s leading science and technology business parks, with a mixture of Fortune 500 companies, local and international high-tech enterprises, U.S. space and defense agencies, thriving business incubators and competitive higher-education institutions. CRP is the home of 300 companies, more than 26,000 employees and 13,500 students. The Park's major industries are aerospace, defense, engineering, biotechnology, advanced manufacturing, software development, information technology and cybersecurity.

Cummings Research Park was voted as the Most Outstanding Science Park in the World in 1997 by the Association of University Research Parks and in 2017 The Park was presented with the Developing Communities of Innovation award.

History 

In 1961, Milton K. Cummings, then president of Brown Engineering Company, and Joseph C. Moquin, his later successor, selected a tract of undeveloped land on the western edge of Huntsville for building a new headquarters.  Located adjacent to land that had recently been acquired by the University of Alabama for developing a Huntsville Branch and within a few miles of major Army and NASA development centers on Redstone Arsenal, this area was ideal for establishing a high-technology research park.

Cummings and Moquin, with the support of rocket pioneer Wernher von Braun, proposed that the City of Huntsville zone the area as a research park district. In 1962, the City established this zoning, with 3,000 acres of land officially designated Huntsville Research Park.

Brown Engineering (later Teledyne Brown Engineering) was the first to build in the park, opening its campus the inaugural year. As America rushed into the space race, other companies quickly followed; these included giant national firms such as Lockheed, Northrop, and IBM, smaller outside firms wanting to open Huntsville operations, and a number of newly organized local enterprises.

In parallel with the growth of industry occupants, the adjacent academic campus also matured; in 1970, this became the University of Alabama in Huntsville (UAH). The UAH Foundation owned a large portion of land in the research park district, and served as a major promoter of development. When Milton Cummings died in 1973, the district was renamed the Cummings Research Park (CRP). By the end of the 1970s, the development of what is now known as CRP East was nearing completion.

In 1982, the second major phase of CRP was launched with the planned development of CRP West. A substantial new parcel of land, exceeding 800 acres, was purchased and a master plan was established by the City of Huntsville. This new phase strengthened the development restrictions on the park, rivaling, and in many instances exceeding, the quality of planned research and development parks anywhere in the world. The City of Huntsville has continued to acquire land for future growth of CRP, and it is now approaching 4,000 acres.

In 2007, a major retail and hospitality destination was added to the park. Bridge Street Towne Center is home to many restaurants, shops, 3 hotels, a movie theater and a 240 luxury apartment development. 

In 2015 and 2016, CRP underwent a comprehensive master planning process to ensure another 50 years of success.

References

External links 
 Cummings Research Park page at Chamber of Commerce of Huntsville/Madison County

Economy of Alabama
Science parks in the United States
High-technology business districts in the United States
Huntsville-Decatur, AL Combined Statistical Area
Business parks of the United States
Geography of Huntsville, Alabama